Ambt Montfort is a former municipality in the Dutch province of Limburg.

In 1991, the municipalities of Montfort, Posterholt, Reutje and Sint Odiliënberg merged. The original name of the merged municipality was "Posterholt", but it was changed in "Ambt Montfort" in 1994. On January 1, 2007, Ambt Montfort merged into the municipality of Roerdalen.

Ambt Montfort is the birthplace of Formula One driver Jos Verstappen.

External links

Official Website

Municipalities of the Netherlands established in 1994
Municipalities of the Netherlands disestablished in 2007
Former municipalities of Limburg (Netherlands)
Roerdalen